Kamlesh Paswan  is an Indian politician and is Member of Parliament in the 17th Lok Sabha of India. Paswan represents the Bansgaon constituency of Uttar Pradesh and is a member of the Bharatiya Janata Party political party.

Early life and education
Kamlesh Paswan was born Pasi community in Gorakhpur, Uttar Pradesh. He is a matriculate from St. Paul's School in Gorakhpur. His father, Om Prakash Paswan, was also a politician and was killed in 1996 while addressing a public meeting.

Political career
Paswan was also a member of the Uttar Pradesh Legislative Assembly from Maniram (Vidhan Sabha constituency) as Samajwadi Party Candidate . In 2009, he joined Bharatiya Janta Party and contested for Lok Sabha elections and became a member of the 15th Lok Sabha from Bansgaon constituency. He is a member of 16th Lok Sabha.

Threat on life
In October 2013, Paswan claimed that his life was under threat from "political rivals and mafia" in the region. Reportedly, he had requested the District magistrate and the Superintendent of police for providing him security cover. Paswan also stated that he contemplated raising his security concerns to the Chief Minister of U.P., Akhilesh Yadav.

Posts held

See also

15th Lok Sabha
Politics of India
Parliament of India
Government of India
Bansgaon (Lok Sabha constituency)
Bharatiya Janata Party

References 
 

India MPs 2009–2014
India MPs 2014–2019
Lok Sabha members from Uttar Pradesh
Members of the Uttar Pradesh Legislative Assembly
Bharatiya Janata Party politicians from Uttar Pradesh
People from Gorakhpur
1976 births
Living people
People from Gorakhpur district
India MPs 2019–present